Local 3 can refer to American labor unions and broadcast stations:

 "Local 3" refers to an Alameda, California-based trade union, designed as "IUOE Local 3" by the International Union of Operating Engineers
  The moniker Local 3 is used by the following stations:
KCDO-TV channel 3, an independent station in Sterling, Colorado
 WJMN-TV channel 3, a MyNetworkTV affiliate in Escanaba, Michigan
 WRCB channel 3, an NBC affiliate in Chattanooga, Tennessee